The Rickettsiaceae are a family of bacteria. The genus Rickettsia is the most prominent genus within the family. The bacteria that eventually formed the mitochondrion (an organelle in eukaryotic cells) is believed to have originated from this family.  Most human pathogens in this family are in genus Rickettsia.  They spend part of their lifecycle in the bodies of arthropods such as ticks or lice, and are then transmitted to humans or other mammals by the bite of the arthropod.  It contains Gram-negative bacteria, very sensitive to environmental exposure, thus is adapted to obligate intracellular infection.  Rickettsia rickettsii is considered the prototypical infectious organism in the group.

Genomics
Comparative genomic analysis has identified three proteins, RP030, RP187 and RP192, which are uniquely found in members of the family Rickettsiaceae and serve as molecular markers for this family. In addition, conserved signature indels in a number of proteins including a four-amino-acid insert in transcription repair coupling factor Mfd, a 10-amino-acid insert in ribosomal protein L19, one-amino-acid inserts each in  the FtsZ protein and the major sigma factor 70, and a one-amino-acid deletion in exonuclease VII protein that are specific for the Rickettsiaceae species have been identified.

References 

 
Rickettsiales